Kovach (Cyrillic: Ковач, meaning blacksmith) is a gender-neutral Slavic surname. Notable people with the surname include: 

Bill Kovach (born 1932), American journalist
Jim Kovach (born 1956), American entrepreneur, physician, attorney, and football player
June Kovach (1932–2010), American-born Swiss film director, film editor and concert pianist
Kelly Kovach Schoenly, American softball coach and former softball player
Nancy Kovack (born 1935), American film and television actress
Nora Kovach (1931–2009), Hungarian ballerina
William Kovach (1909–1966), politician from Alberta, Canada

See also
Kovács

References